O. americanus may refer to:
 Odontophrynus americanus, a frog species
 Oreamnos americanus, a goat species
 Osmanthus americanus, a shrub species

See also
 Americanus (disambiguation)